Sir Archibald Michie , (1813 – 21 June 1899) was an English-born Australian lawyer, journalist, Agent-General, Attorney-General of Victoria and politician.

Michie was born in Maida Vale, London, the son of Archibald Michie, a merchant. Michie junior was educated at Westminster School and was admitted to the Middle Temple in November 1834 and called to the Bar in May 1838.

In the late 1830s, Michie migrated to Sydney, Australia and married Mary Richardson in 1840. The following year he was admitted to the New South Wales barrister roll. Michie was associated with Sir James Martin and Robert Lowe (1st Viscount Sherbrooke) on the Atlas newspaper when it was founded in 1844.

Around 1849, Michie returned to England for a short while and then migrated to Canada. Then he returned to Sydney and moved to Melbourne in 1852. He was admitted to practise in the Supreme Court of Victoria and became associated with Thomas à Beckett. Michie was appointed to the Victorian Legislative Council in November 1852, but resigned in August 1853 to focus on his legal practice.

Michie was elected as a member for Melbourne in the Victorian Legislative Assembly in 1856 and worked with Protestant liberals Richard Heales, James McCulloch, Frederick Thomas Sargood and James Service.  Michie helped John O'Shanassy to bring down the William Haines ministry in March 1857, but did not become part of O'Shanassy's government; Michie did become attorney-general, however, in the reconstructed Haines ministry from 29 April 1857 to 10 March 1858.

Michie represented St Kilda October 1859 to July 1861 (and November 1864 to December 1865), Polwarth and South Grenville August 1863 to August 1864  and Ballarat West May 1870 to January 1871.

Michie became Victoria's first Q.C. in 1863; from 4 August 1863 to 18 July 1866 he was minister of justice in the McCulloch ministry. From 8 April 1870 to 19 June 1871, he was attorney-general in the third McCulloch ministry. in August 1871 Michie was elected to the Central Province of the Victorian Legislative Council, a position he held until resignation in March 1873. From 1873 to 1879 Michie was Agent-General in London for Victoria and was appointed K.C.M.G. in 1878.

References

 

1813 births
1899 deaths
Australian federationists
Australian King's Counsel
Members of the Victorian Legislative Council
Knights Commander of the Order of St Michael and St George
Members of the Victorian Legislative Assembly
Agents-General for Victoria
English emigrants to colonial Australia
Politicians from London
Lawyers from London
Attorneys-General of the Colony of Victoria
19th-century Australian journalists
19th-century Australian male writers
19th-century male writers
19th-century Australian politicians
Australian male journalists